FG Sagittae is a supergiant star in the constellation Sagitta at a distance of 4000 light-years. When first noted in 1943, it was identified to be a variable star, and it was found to be a hot, blue star of stellar spectral type B in 1955. Since then it has expanded and cooled, becoming a yellow G-type star by 1991, and then further cooling to become an orange K-type star. It started to pulsate when becoming an A-type star with a period of 15 days. This period later increased to over 100 days.

Since 1992 the star has exhibited fadings and recoveries similar to that of a R Coronae Borealis variable star; this behavior is emphasized by a hydrogen deficiency typical for this class of stars. It has been proposed that this star has undergone a late thermal pulse (LTP) of helium fusion after having left the asymptotic giant branch (AGB) to move towards the hottest end of the "white dwarf cooling track". This thermal pulse is believed to have revived this aged star to once again, for a short time, behave as an AGB star.

FG Sagittae is the central star of the planetary nebula Henize 1-5.

Observations 

In 1943, a star designated AN 377.1943 was discovered to be a previously-unknown variable star.  It was designated CSV 5066 as a suspected variable, and then FG Sagittae as a confirmed variable star.  At the time, its variations were described as being irregular, but it was soon noted that the average brightness was steadily increasing.  It brightened by about two magnitudes between 1943 and 1970, and then began to fade.  Examination of old photographic observations found that the star had been brightening since at least 1900, with extrapolations suggesting that the minimum had occurred around 1880.  As it faded, FG Sagittae began to show periodic variations, at first a period of 80 days, but increasing to 130 days.  In 1992, the periodic variations ceased and the brightness decreased by five magnitudes in only two months.  Since then, it has continued to show occasional deep fading events, appearing much like an R Coronae Borealis star.

The spectrum of FG Sagittae when it was first noted as a variable star was that of a blue supergiant.  The first reliable spectral class is B0 in 1930.  Extrapolation of the brightness and colour indices suggest it may have been an O3 star in 1890.  It then steadily cooled, with the spectral class becoming as late as K2 in the 1980s.  The spectral class has since stayed as a G or K type supergiant, but there have been dramatic changes.  The abundances of various elements have either increased or decreased: s-process elements became at least 25 times more abundant between 1967 and 1974; iron peak elements became less visible; and carbon-rich dust became strongly visible after 1992.  Observations of the spectrum after 1992 are hindered by the dust formation, but the s-process and rare earth elements appear to have continued becoming more abundant.

Planetary nebula 
There is a very faint visible planetary nebula, Henize 1-5, around FG Sagittae, around visual magnitude 23.  This formed when FG Sagittae first left the asymptotic giant branch.  FG Sagittae is now losing mass at about  every million years and a dust shell has formed around the star.  This may form a second planetary nebula.

Evolution 
During the deep fades since 1992, even lower temperatures have been calculated, but these may represent observations of obscuring dust rather than the surface of the star itself.

The luminosity then became more or less stable until 1992.

When the star faded in 1992, it was obscured by dust formation and comparisons of temperature and luminosity became more difficult.  The visual luminosity dropped by about five magnitudes, but the infrared brightness increased by a comparable amount.  Models of the dust around the star suggest that the luminosity dropped sharply for a few hundred days as dust formed and was heated, but the underlying stellar luminosity was essentially constant and remained constant until at least 2001.

The underlying properties of FG Sagittae changed on a timescale almost unheard-of for a star, from a small very hot post-asymptotic giant branch star becoming a white dwarf, to a hot supergiant and then a cool supergiant.  This is believed to have been due to a helium flash in a shell that had previously been inactive since the star left the asymptotic giant branch.  This is known as a late thermal pulse or very late thermal pulse, depending on the exact timing.  Models approximate the behaviour of FG Sagittae although there are still detailed discrepancies.

See also 
 Sakurai's Object, also known as V4334 Sgr, another presumed late thermal pulsing object.
 V605 Aquilae.

References

External links
 AAVSO Variable Star of the Month. FG Sagittae: June 2008
 AAVSO Variable Star of the Month. FG Sagittae: November 1998

Variable stars
Sagitta (constellation)
Sagittae, FG
Supergiants
099527
J20115606+2020044
Emission-line stars